Sayed Hassan Issa (Arabic:سيد حسن عيسى) (born 14 September 1997) is a Qatari born-Egyptian footballer. He currently plays for Umm Salal.

Career statistics

Club

Notes

References

External links
 

Qatari footballers
1997 births
Living people
Lekhwiya SC players
Al-Duhail SC players
Al-Khor SC players
Al-Sailiya SC players
Umm Salal SC players
Place of birth missing (living people)
Naturalised citizens of Qatar
Qatari people of Egyptian descent
Qatar Stars League players
Association football forwards